Crescent Lake State Airport  is a public airport located two miles (3.2 km) north of Crescent Lake in Klamath County, Oregon, United States. On-airport camping is allowed, and boat rentals are available nearby.  The airport is closed from November 1 through May 1 due to snow.

External links
FAA Form 5010 for Crescent Lake State Airport
Oregon Department of Aviation page regarding Crescent Lake State Airport

Airports in Klamath County, Oregon